Mangelia adansoni is a species of sea snail, a marine gastropod mollusk in the family Mangeliidae.

Taxonomy
Originally placed in Cythara Schumacher, 1817, an unaccepted generic name; tentatively here placed in Mangelia

Description

Distribution
This marine species occurs off West Africa

References

 Knudsen, J. (1952) Marine prosobranchs of tropical West Africa collected by the Atlantide Expedition, 1945–46. Videnskabelige Meddelelser fra Dansk Naturhistorisk Forening i Kjobenhavn, 114, 129–185, 3 pls.

External links
  Tucker, J.K. 2004 Catalog of recent and fossil turrids (Mollusca: Gastropoda). Zootaxa 682:1-1295.

adansoni
Gastropods described in 1952